Rushern Leslie Baker III (born October 24, 1958) is an American lawyer and politician. A member of the Democratic Party, he was elected county executive of Prince George's County, Maryland in 2010 and won re-election in 2014. In 2018 and 2022, he mounted an unsuccessful primary campaign to become Governor of Maryland.

Early life and education
Baker was born in Valdosta, Georgia, and grew up in Springfield, Massachusetts. Baker's father, a Green Beret who served in the Vietnam War, mother, and 3 siblings lived on an Army base in Okinawa, Japan for a time before settling in Massachusetts. Baker recalls having learning struggles in school. He received his bachelor's degree and Juris Doctor from Howard University in 1982 and 1986, respectively.

Career

Maryland House of Delegates

Baker represented legislative district 22B in the Maryland House of Delegates from 1994 to 2003, where he served on various subcommittees and task forces. He also served as executive director for the Community Teachers Institute, located in Lanham, Maryland.

Prince George's County Executive
In 2002 and 2006, Baker ran unsuccessfully for the office of Prince George's County Executive. In 2006, he was narrowly defeated by the incumbent County Executive, Jack B. Johnson in the primary election.

In November 2010, Baker won the election to replace Johnson, who was term-limited. Baker was sworn in as County Executive on December 6, 2010.

Baker served as President of County Executives of America from 2014 to 2015. He was named Public Official of the Year by Governing Magazine in 2015.

As County Executive, Baker led land and real estate purchases to move county agencies to Largo, Maryland from the County Seat of Upper Marlboro, Maryland.

2018 Maryland gubernatorial election campaign

On June 21, 2017, Baker announced his candidacy for Governor of Maryland in the 2018 election, currently held by Larry Hogan (R). Baker's ticket included Baltimore attorney Elizabeth Embry. He was endorsed by the Washington Post, but lost the Democratic primary to Ben Jealous, 40 percent to 29 percent.

2022 Maryland gubernatorial election campaign

On April 8, 2021, Baker announced his candidacy for Governor of Maryland in the 2022 election, which will be vacated by Larry Hogan (R), who is term limited, in 2023. His running mate was Nancy Navarro, a member of the Montgomery County Council. He suspended his campaign on June 10, 2022.

Personal life
Baker met his wife, Christa Beverly, as an undergraduate at Howard University in 1978. Baker is a member of Gamma Pi chapter of Omega Psi Phi fraternity, as is Jack B. Johnson who preceded Baker as County Executive prior to Johnson's arrest.  The Bakers lived in Washington, D.C., briefly, before settling in Cheverly, MD, where they raised three children, including son Rushern Baker IV.

In 2010, Baker's wife was diagnosed with Early-onset Alzheimer's disease. The family decided to speak publicly about her diagnosis in 2012 in order to increase awareness for the disease and advocate for greater funding for medical research. Baker is an active member of the Alzheimer's Association.

In 2021, Baker's wife Christa died due to Alzheimer's disease.

Electoral history

References

External links

 Campaign website
 Government website

1958 births
20th-century African-American politicians
African-American men in politics
20th-century American politicians
21st-century African-American politicians
21st-century American lawyers
21st-century American politicians
African-American lawyers
African-American state legislators in Maryland
Howard University alumni
Living people
Democratic Party members of the Maryland House of Delegates
People from Valdosta, Georgia
Prince George's County, Maryland Executives